Pokétoon: The Pokémon Cartoon Animation is an original net animation (ONA) series featuring different kinds of short animations with different Pokémon. They first aired in June 2020 on the Japanese Pokémon YouTube channel, and later released on Pokémon TV in English in August 2022, and later on the English Pokémon YouTube channel in Fall 2022.

The first short, Scraggy and Mimikyu which released on June 5, 2020. After a year, the second short named as The Pancham Who Wants to Be a Hero was released on May 5, 2021. After some days, several additional episodes were announced on May 10, 2021, and ultimately there were a total of 8 episodes.

Episode list

References

External links 

  
 Official YouTube playlist

2020 anime ONAs
2021 anime ONAs
Magic Bus (studio)
Studio Colorido
Pokémon anime